The 1928 United States Senate election in Massachusetts was held on November 6, 1928, with Democratic incumbent David I. Walsh defeating his challengers.

Democratic primary

Candidates
 David I. Walsh, incumbent Senator

Results
Senator Walsh was unopposed for renomination.

Republican primary

Candidates
 Butler Ames, former U.S. Representative from Lowell
 Eben S. Draper Jr., former State Senator from Hopedale and son of former Governor Eben Draper
 Benjamin Loring Young, Weston selectman and former Speaker of the Massachusetts House of Representatives

Withdrawn
 Robert M. Washburn, former State Senator (endorsed Ames)

Results

General election

Candidates
 John J. Ballam, founding member of the Communist Party of America (Workers')
 Alfred Baker Lewis, candidate for Senate in 1926 (Socialist)
 David I. Walsh, incumbent Senator (Democratic)
 Benjamin Loring Young, Weston selectman and former Speaker of the Massachusetts House of Representatives (Republican)

Results

References

  3. ^ www.hope1842.com/draperebenjr

1928
Massachusetts
1928 Massachusetts elections